XV yö (Tauko III) is a 1980 studio album by Finnish rock band Juice Leskinen Slam. It was produced by Tommi Liuhala and Juice Leskinen. The album lasts 36 minutes and 54 seconds.

The album was included in Robert Dimery's 2006 book 1001 Albums You Must Hear Before You Die.

Track listing

A Side
"Rock'n Roll'n Blues'n Jazz" – 3.12
"Viidestoista yö" – 4.09
"Pieni kalmistosarja" – 4.28 
"Kuollut mies"
"Ex-vainajan muistelmat"
"Ruumishuone goodbye"
"Haetarirock" – 3.20
"Edestakaisin (Laihia–Heinäpää)" – 3.17

B Side
"Outoon valoon" – 3.14
"Mene kotiin" – 2.59
"Mies joka rakastaa itseään" – 2.56
"Ei elämästä selviä hengissä" – 2.27
"Naisellinen nainen" – 2.57
"Lauloin miehen maisemaan" – 3.50

Chart positions
Finland: #6 (February 1980)

Sources

Juice Leskinen albums
1980 albums